West Lancaster is an unincorporated community in Fayette County, in the U.S. state of Ohio.

History
West Lancaster was founded ca. 1850.  A post office called West Lancaster was established in 1852, and remained in operation until 1906. West Lancaster had 142 inhabitants in 1914.

References

Unincorporated communities in Fayette County, Ohio
Unincorporated communities in Ohio